The Hard Way is the fourth album by English singer-songwriter James Hunter, released on 10 June 2008. The album charted at number one on the Billboard Top Blues Album chart and number five on the Billboard Heatseekers chart.

Track listing
All songs written by James Hunter.
 "The Hard Way" – 2:29
 "Tell Her" – 3:24
 "Don't Do Me No Favours" – 4:18
 "Carina" – 4:10
 "She's Got a Way" – 2:41
 "'Til the End" – 4:19
 "Hand It Over" – 3:27
 "Jacqueline" – 2:28
 "Class Act" – 3:00
 "Ain't Goin' Nowhere" – 2:19
 "Believe Me Baby" – 2:44
 "Strange But True" – 3:16

Personnel
James Hunter – guitar, vocals
Lee Badau – baritone saxophone
Ellen Blair – violin
Gillon Cameron – violin
Damian Hand – tenor saxophone, string arrangements, musical direction  
Kyle Koehler – Hammond organ
Jennymay Logan – violin, viola  
Gill Morley – violin  
Nicky Sweeney – violin
Tony Woollard – cello

Guest musicians
Allen Toussaint – piano, electric piano, backing vocals
George Chandler – backing vocals
Dave Priseman – trumpet, flugelhorn
B. J. Cole – pedal steel guitar

Production
Christian "ChrisRam" Ramirez – photography
Liam Watson – producer, engineer, mixing
Richard Mantel – art direction, design

Notes

2008 albums
Albums produced by Liam Watson (record producer)
Hear Music albums